No. 86 Squadron RAF was a unit of the Royal Air Force during World War II. Attached to Coastal Command the unit flew reconnaissance and air-sea rescue missions, anti-shipping strikes, and anti-submarine patrols.

History

Formation
No. 86 Squadron was first formed on 1 September 1917, but was not yet operational when it was disbanded on 4 July 1918 to provide reinforcements for active units in France. It began to reform as a ground attack squadron on 30 October 1918, but on the signing of the Armistice two weeks later, this was suspended.

World War II

The squadron was reformed on 6 December 1940, initially flying Blenheim light bombers on convoy escort duties. In June 1941 the squadron was re-equipped with Beaufort torpedo bombers, and began minelaying sorties on 15 July. After flying reconnaissance and air-sea rescue missions for three months the squadron started anti-shipping strikes, with the first torpedo bomber operation taking place on 12 December.

In March 1942 the Squadron moved to northern Scotland to engage in patrols and strikes on the Norwegian coast, before being converted to Liberators by early 1943. In March of that year, it moved to Northern Ireland to fly anti-submarine patrols, before moving to RAF Reykjavík, Iceland, a year later. In July 1944 the Squadron return to Scotland, where it remained for the rest of the war.

86 Squadron was a successful anti-submarine unit, accounting for fourteen U-boats destroyed during the Second World War.

Post war
On 10 June 1945, 86 Squadron joined Transport Command's No. 301 Wing, flying missions to India. Finally, on 25 April 1946, the Squadron was disbanded.

Aircraft operated

References

External links

 RAF Liberator Squadrons : No. 86 Squadron
 Royal Air Force History Section : History of No. 86 Squadron
 historyofwar.org: No. 86 Squadron RAF

 
 

086
086
Aircraft squadrons of the Royal Air Force in World War II
Military units and formations established in 1940
Military units and formations disestablished in 1946